The 1921 Toledo Blue and Gold football team was an American football team that represented Toledo University (renamed the University of Toledo in 1967) during the 1921 college football season. This was the team's first season in the Northwest Ohio League.  Led by second-year coach Joseph Dwyer, Toledo compiled a 3–5 record.

Schedule

References

Toledo
Toledo Rockets football seasons
Toledo Blue and Gold football